Alf Wilson (10 October 1908 – 16 June 1956) was a South African boxer. He competed in the men's middleweight event at the 1928 Summer Olympics.

References

External links
 

1908 births
1956 deaths
Middleweight boxers
South African male boxers
Olympic boxers of South Africa
Boxers at the 1928 Summer Olympics
Place of birth missing